Emanuel Augustus Byrd (born December 9, 1994) is an American football tight end who is currently a free agent. He played college football at Marshall, and was signed by the Kansas City Chiefs as an undrafted free agent in 2017.

College career
Byrd played quarterback and tight end for Georgia Military College in 2013 and 2014. He transferred to attended Marshall University, where he played tight end on the Marshall Thundering Herd football team in 2015 and 2016.

College statistics

Professional career

Kansas City Chiefs
After going undrafted in the 2017 NFL Draft, Byrd signed with the Kansas City Chiefs on May 9, 2017. On July 31, 2017, he was waived by the Chiefs.

Green Bay Packers
On August 5, 2017, Byrd signed with the Green Bay Packers. He was waived by the Packers on September 2, 2017. He was re-signed to the practice squad on November 3, 2017. He was promoted to the active roster on December 26, 2017.

On September 1, 2018, Byrd was waived by the Packers.

NFL career statistics

Regular season

References

External links
Marshall Thundering Herd bio
Green Bay Packers bio

1994 births
Living people
American football tight ends
Green Bay Packers players
Kansas City Chiefs players
Marshall Thundering Herd football players
Players of American football from Georgia (U.S. state)
Sportspeople from Albany, Georgia